Benjamin Kheng (born 15 August 1990) is a Singaporean singer-songwriter, and former national swimmer. Kheng made his music debut with the Singaporean band The Sam Willows, which debuted in 2012.

Early life and education
Kheng was a former national youth swimmer, having trained since he was 6. He attended Anglo-Chinese School (Primary), Anglo-Chinese School (Independent), Singapore Sports School and has a diploma in Arts and Theatre Management from Republic Polytechnic.

Career
Kheng is the keyboardist, rhythm guitarist and vocalist for The Sam Willows. After announcing their hiatus in May 2019, he has since pursued his solo career.

Besides music, Kheng co-created “The BenZi Project,” an online comedy sketch series on YouTube with Singaporean YouTuber Hirzi Zulkiflie.

Kheng is an advocate for youth and social causes, Benjamin has also been invited to speak at TEDxYouth to share his experience in overcoming depression and anxiety disorder with synesthesia.

In August 2021, Kheng collaborated with a virtual influencer, Rae; writing the song they sang together, Worlds.

Personal life 
Kheng has a younger sister, Narelle Kheng, who is also part of The Sam Willows. He is married to Singaporean model and 987FM host, Naomi Yeo.

Filmography

Movies

Television

Variety

Theater

Discography

Extended plays
A Sea That Never Stops (2020)

Singles

References

External links

 at The Sam Willows Band
 at Fly Entertainment

	
	
	

1990 births
Living people
Singaporean male actors
Singaporean jazz musicians
21st-century Singaporean male singers
Singaporean pop singers
Singaporean singer-songwriters
Singaporean Hokkien pop singers
Jazz guitarists
Jazz pianists
Jazz fusion musicians
Jazz bandleaders
Male pianists
21st-century pianists
21st-century guitarists
21st-century Singaporean male actors
Male jazz musicians
The Sam Willows members